Sulaymān ibn ʿAlī al-Hāshimī (c. 700–759) was an early Abbasid prince. He served as governor of Basra from 750 to 755.

Career
The son of Ali ibn Abd Allah ibn al-Abbas, Sulayman was a paternal uncle of the first two Abbasid caliphs al-Saffah (r. 750–754) and al-Mansur (r. 754–775), making him one of the "uncles" ('umumah) that held a high degree of influence during the early years following the Abbasid Revolution. In 750–1 he was appointed by al-Saffah as governor of the important post of Basra in southern Iraq together with its dependencies, as well as a number of other provinces including the Tigris districts, Bahrayn, Oman and Mihrajanqadhaq. In 753 the caliph also selected him to lead the pilgrimage for that year.

During his administration of Basra, Sulayman carried out extensive public works projects to develop the region, including building new canals and making improvements the local water supply. He also assisted Khazim ibn Khuzayma al-Tamimi during the latter's campaign against Kharijite rebels in Oman in 750–1 by providing him with ships to transport his army, and in 754 he allowed his brother Abd Allah take refuge in Basra after the failure of his rebellion against al-Mansur. He and Isa ibn Ali eventually delivered their brother to al-Mansur on the condition that his life be spared, but this agreement was quickly violated and the caliph surreptitiously put Abdallah to death.

Sulayman remained as governor until c. 755, when al-Mansur dismissed him in favor of Sufyan ibn Mu'awiyah. He died in Basra in October 759 at the age of 59, and was succeeded by several sons, including Muhammad and Ja'far.

Notes

References
 
 
 
 
 
 
 
 

700 births
759 deaths
Abbasid governors of Basra
8th-century Arabs